Brandon City is a former provincial electoral division in Manitoba, Canada.

It was initially created as Brandon in 1881, following the westward expansion of Manitoba's boundaries.  It was eliminated through redistribution before the 1886 provincial election, and replaced with Brandon East and Brandon West.  The area was further redistributed prior to the 1888 election, and Brandon City was created along with Brandon North and Brandon South.

The constituency was renamed Brandon for the 1958 provincial election.  It disappeared from the electoral map with the 1969 provincial election, when the city was once again divided into Brandon East and Brandon West.

Provincial representatives for Brandon

Provincial representatives for Brandon City

Provincial representatives for Brandon (re-established)

Former provincial electoral districts of Manitoba